Virtuosi Racing (previously known as Virtuosi UK, and UNI Virtuosi in Formula 2) is a British racing team currently competing in the FIA Formula 2 Championship. The team previously ran in the Auto GP series, in addition to running the Russian Time outfit in Formula 2 and its predecessor GP2 Series up until 2018. With the withdrawal of Russian Time, the team assumed its new name UNI Virtuosi Racing for the 2019 Formula 2 season.

History
In 2012, Paul Devlin and Andy Roche approached businessman Declan Lohan for financial backing and Virtuosi UK team was founded at Carleton Rode, Norfolk in order to participate in the Auto GP. The team signed GP2 Series driver Pål Varhaug. His team-mates in the first rounds was European F3 Open driver Matteo Beretta and Formula Renault 3.5 Series driver Sten Pentus, before they was replaced by Auto GP veteran Francesco Dracone. Varhaug won feature race at Sonoma and reverse-grid races at Monza and Hungaroring, finishing as runner-up in the drivers' standings and bringing fourth place in the teams' standings.

For 2013, the team signed FIA European Formula 3 Championship graduate Andrea Roda. He was partnered by Max Snegirev, who previously raced for Campos Racing. Also British team supported Comtec by Virtuosi entry. Unlike the previous season Virtuosi drivers even failed to achieve podium finish and downgraded to seventh in the teams' standings.

The squad prolonged Andrea Roda for 2014 campaign. Also the team expanded to three cars for two opening rounds, fielding Richard Gonda and Sam Dejonghe. At Imola, second car was occupied by returnee Varhaug but he was replaced at Spielberg by Tamás Pál Kiss, who left Zele Racing. Also at Spielberg Roda won a reverse-grid race, it was first win for Virtuosi since 2012. Kiss collected another two wins for the team at Nürburgring and Estoril. The team finished as runner-up in the teams' standings.

In 2015, the team signed German Formula Three driver Nikita Zlobin. As well the team will replace iSport International in the managing of the Russian Time team in the GP2 Series.

On 4 December 2018, it was announced Virtuosi would replace the outgoing Russian Time outfit in the FIA Formula 2 Championship in  under the name UNI-Virtuosi. The following day, the team confirmed Guanyu Zhou as its first driver. Day after, Luca Ghiotto filled the remained slot in the Virtuosi's line-up.

On 20 October 2021, Virtuosi Racing announced its expansion to Formula 4 racing by entering the F4 British Championship from the 2022 season onwards.

Current series results

FIA Formula 2 Championship

In detail
(key) (Races in bold indicate pole position) (Races in italics indicate fastest lap)

* Season still in progress.

F4 British Championship

Timeline

Notes

References

External links
 

British auto racing teams
Auto GP teams
GP2 Series teams
2012 establishments in the United Kingdom
Auto racing teams established in 2012
FIA Formula 2 Championship teams